POC21 was an innovation camp that took place in Chateau de Millemont near Paris. It lasted for five weeks from August 15, 2015, until September 20, 2015. POC21 innovation camp hosted 100 makers, designers and innovators to develop a Proof of Concept of a truly sustainable society. The scope of such an innovation camp was unseen before. The 'accelerator' program developed 12 open source hardware projects from energy production and monitoring to living, mobility, communication and food production and preservation.

POC21 innovation camp was a cooperation between the German collective Open State and the French network OuiShare.

Principles 

POC21 innovation camp brought together the startup world, DIY scene and environmentalist ideas to show solutions to fight climate change. The main principles of POC21 innovation camp derive from Sustainable Design, Open Source and Zero Waste.

Structure 

POC21 innovation camp focused on the development of technology and on creative processes. The creative processes involved a.o. workshops, keynotes, mentoring (with a.o. Bruce Sterling and Michel Bauwens from P2P Foundation), reality checks with external business and science experts and regular retrospectives. The twelve project teams could use the knowledge and experience from 200 trainers, marketing experts, product designers and engineers to further develop their prototype in five weeks.

The camp was a temporary commune. In the five weeks of the camp a living prototype of a sustainable society was established and concepts like Coworking, Coliving, non-hierarchical structures and consensus principles were used and put into practice.

The infrastructure of Chateau de Millemont was basic with a community kitchen, compost toilets and a tent camp. The FabLab provided high tech tools, 3D printer, laser cutter and CNC machines. The camp itself was a prototype for a local micro factory.

40% of the financial budget of 1M € was donated by both business companies and foundations, 20% originated from public subsidies.

12 projects 
 $30 Wind Turbine: low-cost and easy-to-build recycling solution for individual energy harvesting
 Aker: Kits for urban gardening
 Kitchen B: modular kitchen reducing energy and waste 
 Bicitractor: pedal driven tractor as a fuel less alternative for big industrial machines
 Faircap: reusable water filter for bottles
 Nautile: energy saving kettle
 Open Energy Monitor: tool for visualizing domestic energy consumption
 Myfood: permaculture and aquaponics greenhouse
 SolarOSE: solar concentrator to provide thermal energy
 Showerloop: real-time shower looping system minimizing water and energy usage
 Sunzilla: modular and portable solar-powered generators to power remote areas
 Velo M2: multi-functional cargo bike capsules

All twelve projects are open source and can be built, modified and distributed. The blueprints are available online.

Media coverage 

From November 30 until December 12, 2015, Paris hosted the UN climate conference COP21. The POC21 innovation camp was a grassroots movement complementary to the political narrative and therefore reached an international audience and gained much critical acclaim.
 The media coverage was especially big in France

 and in Germany.

The documentary movie premiered on November 29, 2015, in Berlin and is available online.

Events 

The results of the POC21 innovation camp were featured on many events along the UN climate conference COP21.

 Finissage at Chateau de Millemont, September 19 & 20, 2015
 Expo Paris de L'avenir, November 18 until December 13, 2015
 COY11, November 26 until 28th 2015
 PlaceToB, November 29 until December 4, 2015
 ICI Montreuil, December 5, 2015
 Climate Action Zone, December 7 until December 11, 2015

See also 
 Hackathon
 FabLab

External links 
 Official webpage of POC21
 Proof Of Concept: 100 Geeks, 5 Weeks, 1 Future - documentary movie
 The POC21 Innovation Camp report as .pdf

References 

Content in this edit is translated from the existing German Wikipedia article at :de:POC21 Innovationscamp; see its history for attribution.

2015 in France